Sophie Blake (born 9 November 1972), is an British television presenter and former model.

Career
Blake studied drama, and then travelled working in bars and restaurants for a few years. She did some modelling, and put a home-made show-reel together which United Sports picked up, and got her interviewing footballers in the back of limousines. She then worked on Sport on Five on Five, including presenting Techno Games.

Blake used to work for Sky Sports presenting speedway, she stood down from this role at the end of the 2007 season. She has also interviewed for the Mosconi Cup and the Super Bowl coverage. She has recently used this higher exposure and her looks to appear in a series of "lads mags" including Maxim and Nuts as well as appearing topless in Page Three.

Personal life
Blake has one younger sister Lucy and two half-sisters Charlotte (14) and Nia (4). She also has two step-brothers, Ritchie and Mark, and a step-sister called Nicola. Sophie Blake has a daughter born in May 2007, called Maya. In 2009 Blake was diagnosed with Asherman's syndrome where due to complications from the birth of her first child the formation of scar tissue causes adhesions in the womb.In November 2010, against all odds, Sophie announced that she was expecting her second child. Blake stated on her instagram that complications from her Asherman's syndrome resulted in her losing the pregnancy and having to have a hysterectomy.

References

1972 births
Living people
English female models
English sports broadcasters
English television presenters